Begum Jahanara Shahnawaz (7 April 1896 – 27 November 1979) was a politician and Muslim League activist. She was the daughter of Sir Muhammad Shafi. Her husband was Mian Shah Nawaz. She studied at Queen Mary College, Lahore, British India.

Political career
In 1918, Jahanara Shahnawaz successfully moved the All India Muslim Women's Conference to pass a resolution against polygamy. In 1935, she founded the Punjab Provincial Women's Muslim League. In the Round Table Conference of 1930, she and Radhabai Subbarayan were the only two active members of women's organisations nominated to the conference; they argued unsuccessfully for a 5 per cent reservation for women in the legislatures.

In 1937, she was elected to the Punjab Legislative Assembly and was appointed Parliamentary Secretary for Education, Medical Relief and Public Health. In 1938 she became a member of the Women's Central Subcommittee of the All India Muslim League. In 1942 India's government appointed her as a member of the National Defense Council, but the Muslim League asked League members to resign from the Defense Council. She refused and was thus removed from the Muslim League. However, she rejoined the League in 1946, and in that same year was elected to the Central Constituent Assembly. That year she also went along with M. A. Ispahani on a goodwill mission to America, to explain the point of view of the Muslim League. She was arrested along with other Muslim League leaders during the Civil disobedience movement in Punjab in 1947.

In 1948, she led a protest of thousands of women in the streets of Lahore, protesting against the fact that a bill encouraging better economic opportunities for women had been removed from the agenda. Prime minister Liaquat Ali Khan intervened, and the Muslim Personal Law of Shariat of 1948 was passed; it legally recognized a woman's right to inherit property, including agricultural land, which had not been recognized during the British Raj.

She was president of the provincial branch of the All India Muslim Women's Conference for seven years, and also served as vice-president of the Central Committee of the All India Muslim Women's Conference.

She was the first woman in Asia to preside over a legislative session.
She was also associated with the education and orphanage committees of the Anjuman-i-Himayat-i-Islam, in Lahore, and with several hospitals, as well as maternity and child welfare committees. She was a member of the All Indian General Committee of the Red Cross Society.

Books
Jahanara Shahnawaz wrote a novel titled Husn Ara Begum and her memoirs titled Father and Daughter: a political autobiography. She also wrote for women's and literary magazines.

Death and legacy
Jahanara Shahnawaz died on 27 November 1979 at age 83. She had three children: Ahmad Shahnawaz Sr., a chemical engineer and the first Indian to attend Massachusetts Institute of Technology (MIT), Nasim Shahnawaz (Nasim Jahan), who married General Akbar Khan and later became a politician of the Pakistan Peoples Party, and Mumtaz Shahnawaz, who died in a plane crash in 1948 while on her way to the United Nations General Assembly to represent Pakistan there.

Jahanara Shahnawaz worked for the economic independence of Pakistan. She was of the view that the foreign policy of Pakistan should be based on trade among nations and not aid.

See also
 Mian Family Baghbanpura
 Arain

References

External links
 Begumshahnawaz.com 

1896 births
1979 deaths
Members of the Constituent Assembly of India
Pakistan Movement activists
20th-century Pakistani women politicians
Mian family
Queen Mary College, Lahore alumni
Members of the Constituent Assembly of Pakistan